Ledo Airfield is a former wartime United States Army Air Forces airfield in India used during the Burma Campaign 1944–1945. It is now abandoned, having been destroyed by the 1950 Assam–Tibet earthquake.

History
The airfield was located at the Railhead for the Ledo Road and was also used as one of the main supply points for "the Hump" transport route to Allied forces in China. It was the home of the C-46 Commandos of the 443rd Troop Carrier Group and the Air Transport Command India-China Wing 1st Air Cargo Resupply Squadron. The airfield was used by transport units until the end of January 1946 when it closed.

References

 Maurer, Maurer. Air Force Combat Units Of World War II. Maxwell Air Force Base, Alabama: Office of Air Force History, 1983. 
 www.pacificwrecks.com – Hathazari keyword search

External links

Airfields of the United States Army Air Forces in British India
Defunct airports in India
Airports in Assam
Airports established in 1944
1944 establishments in India
20th-century architecture in India